The equidistance principle, or principle of equidistance, is a legal concept in maritime boundary claims that a nation's maritime boundaries should conform to a median line that is equidistant from the shores of neighboring nations. The concept was developed in the process of settling disputes in which the borders of adjacent nations were located on a contiguous continental shelf:

The equidistance principle represents one aspect of customary international law, but its importance is evaluated in light of other factors such as history:

History
The United States used equidistance in the 1805 Act of Congress that divided public lands by measurements as close as possible to "equidistant from those two corners which 
stand on the same line." One of the most notable historical events regarding equidistance is the Argument between Germany, Netherlands and Denmark. All three countries laid claim to a specific area within the ocean. Germany claimed that due to special circumstances they owned that land so the three countries fought through the United Nations. Eventually the ICJ stepped in and held a trial regarding the topic.

International law also refers to equidistance. For example, Article 6 of the 1958 Geneva Convention on the Continental Shelf explains:

See also
 Natural prolongation principle

References

Sources
 Dorinda G. Dallmeyer and Louis De Vorsey. (1989). Rights to Oceanic Resources: Deciding and Drawing Maritime Boundaries. Dordrecht: Martinus Nijhoff Publishers. ;  OCLC 18981568

Borders
Maritime boundaries